is a Japanese football player  for Vegalta Sendai.

Playing career
Sugawara was born in Miyagi Prefecture on July 28, 2000. He joined J1 League club Vegalta Sendai from youth team in 2018.

Club
.

Notes

References

External links

 
 

2000 births
Living people
Association football people from Miyagi Prefecture
Japanese footballers
J1 League players
Vegalta Sendai players
Association football forwards